CFAI-FM is a Canadian radio station in Edmundston, New Brunswick broadcasting on 101.1 FM. The station plays a French language active rock radio format and is branded as CFAI 101.1 / 105.1. CFAI also has a rebroadcaster in Grand Falls, broadcasting at 105.1 MHz.

History
On August 21, 1990, La Coopérative des Montagnes Ltée received approval from the CRTC to operate a new FM radio station at Edmundston on the frequency of 101.1 MHz and Saint-Quentin, New Brunswick on 90.1 MHz. The station first went on the air on April 2, 1991. The Grand Falls station operating at 105.1 MHz as CFAI-FM-1 received approval on February 15, 1989.

The former CFAI-FM rebroadcaster at 90.1 MHz in Saint-Quentin is now used by a locally produced radio station as CFJU-FM.

The station is a member of the Alliance des radios communautaires du Canada.

References

External links
 CFAI 101.1 / 105.1
 
 
 

Fai
Fai
Grand Falls, New Brunswick
Edmundston
Fai
Radio stations established in 1991
1991 establishments in New Brunswick